Ervenik Zlatarski may refer to the following places in Croatia

 Ervenik Zlatarski, Zlatar
 Ervenik Zlatarski, Zlatar Bistrica